Montaldo Scarampi is a comune (municipality) in the Province of Asti in the Italian region Piedmont, located about  southeast of Turin and about  southeast of Asti.

Montaldo Scarampi borders the following municipalities: Mombercelli, Montegrosso d'Asti, and Rocca d'Arazzo.

Demographic evolution

References

Cities and towns in Piedmont